Laconia is a town in Boone Township, Harrison County, Indiana, United States. The population was 50 at the 2010 census.

Geography
Laconia is located at  (38.032174, -86.085271).

History
Laconia is a small farming community and was platted in 1816 by John Boone. The Boone family, prominent in the settlement of southern Harrison County, owned large tracts of land throughout the township which bears their name. The original town, consisting of 64 lots, was laid out on property of four owners: William Smith, William Winigar, William Williams, and William Madden, Sr.

Because Laconia was the only town of any size in Boone Township, the settlement became the commercial center of the area. Laconia was the distribution center for mail and was served by the L&N Railroad, which ran on the Kentucky side of the Ohio River.

Because of the proximity of an ample supply of lumber, the Elbert Brothers established a furniture factory near Laconia in 1868. The business burned in 1880 and was never rebuilt. Just south of town, John Ashton had a lumber mill which provided materials for many of Laconia's structures.

Laconia at one time boasted three general stores, one on each corner of the town square, three hotels, several millinery stores, two doctors, a funeral parlor, and a saloon. The Laconia General Store, built in 1927, is the only remaining commercial building operating on the square.

Laconia is the home of an Odd Fellows Club first organized on May 20, 1875.

Two churches were established in Laconia. The Laconia Presbyterian Church was organized in 1874 and met in the town hall and private homes until 1880, when the present church was built on Cross St. The Laconia Methodist Church was organized in 1842, and closed in 2017. The minister traveled from Mauckport, about seven miles to the southwest, to conduct services. The present church was built in 1874 on Main St.

In March 1932, fire destroyed the frame two-story school known as Clay Hill College, and a new school was built of brick in 1932-1933 by the Works Progress Administration (WPA). Upon consolidation of the Harrison County Schools, the building was vacated in 1985. The late Bill Cook restored the structure and it now serves as a community center and apartments.

Another notable building in Laconia is on Main St, the Hurst House built in the Greek Revival style by Dr. Hurst in 1869.

Demographics

2010 census
As of the census of 2010, there were 50 people, 21 households, and 15 families living in the town. The racial makeup of the town was 98.0% White and 2.0% Asian.

There were 21 households, of which 23.8% had children under the age of 18 living with them, 61.9% were married couples living together, 9.5% had a female householder with no husband present, and 28.6% were non-families. 19.0% of all households were made up of individuals, and 4.8% had someone living alone who was 65 years of age or older. The average household size was 2.38 and the average family size was 2.73.

The median age in the town was 41 years. 16% of residents were under the age of 18; 16% were between the ages of 18 and 24; 22% were from 25 to 44; 40% were from 45 to 64; and 6% were 65 years of age or older. The gender makeup of the town was 48.0% male and 52.0% female.

2000 census
As of the census of 2000, there were 29 people, 14 households, and 6 families living in the town. The racial makeup of the town was 100.00% White.

There were 14 households, out of which 21.4% had children under the age of 18 living with them, 28.6% were married couples living together, 14.3% had a female householder with no husband present, and 57.1% were non-families. 57.1% of all households were made up of individuals, and 35.7% had someone living alone who was 65 years of age or older. The average household size was 2.07 and the average family size was 3.50.

In the town, the population was spread out, with 27.6% under the age of 18, 3.4% from 18 to 24, 24.1% from 25 to 44, 27.6% from 45 to 64, and 17.2% who were 65 years of age or older. The median age was 40 years. For every 100 females, there were 45.0 males. For every 100 females age 18 and over, there were 40.0 males.

The median income for a household in the town was $16,667, and the median income for a family was $17,083. Males had a median income of $23,750 versus $16,250 for females. The per capita income for the town was $9,779. There were 60.0% of families and 50.0% of the population living below the poverty line, including 81.8% of under eighteens and none of those over 64.

Notable people

Pinky May, Philadelphia Phillies third baseman
Gary Timberlake, Seattle Pilots pitcher

References

External links
https://web.archive.org/web/20061003093939/http://historic.shcsc.k12.in.us/TOWNS/LACONIA/LACONIA.HTM Laconia History

Towns in Harrison County, Indiana
1816 establishments in Indiana
Towns in Indiana
Populated places established in 1816